Bass Lake is located in the Sierra National Forest, of Madera County, California, approximately  south of the entrance to Yosemite National Park. The lake is approximately four miles long and one-half mile wide.

The lake is formed by the construction of the Crane Valley Dam across Willow Creek, a tributary to the San Joaquin River, and is referenced as Crane Valley Lake. Releases from the dam drive the hydro-electric powerplant operated by Pacific Gas and Electric Company.  The  concrete gravity dam was completed in 1910 by Pacific Gas and Electric.

Most of the land around the lake is part of the Sierra National Forest. The U.S. Forest Service designated the lake an official Recreation Area and has developed campgrounds and picnic areas on the south shore of the lake. The north shore of the lake is primarily made up of private cabins and homes of the unincorporated community, Bass Lake, California, with a year-round population of 575.

Geography 

Bass Lake reservoir was created by the Crane Valley Dam, which impounds North Fork Willow Creek. It’s also fed by South Fork Willow Creek through the Brown’s Ditch diversion, as well as Slide, Pines, and Salter Creeks. Willow Creek is the lake’s only outlet which flows south through the community of North Fork before its confluence with the San Joaquin River.

Goat Mountain, which frames the lake on the west, is named after the goats that helped compact the soil of the original earthwork dam who grazed there.

Climate 
Bass Lake has a Mediterranean climate (Koppen CSA) climate with hot, dry summers and cool, rainy winters with occasional heavy snowstorms. Its hardiness zone is 8b.

Mono Winds
Mono Winds are a localized weather phenomenon of strong foehn winds caused when high-pressure systems in the Great Basin push air up and over the Sierra. The rugged topography funnels the air, intensifying wind speeds to 50 mph with gusts over 80 mph in narrow areas of effect.

Mono Winds occur from October to April but are most common in December and January. Episodes average about one or two a year; some years they do not occur at all. Strong winds can last just a few hours but can be quite destructive. In January 2021, Mono Winds caused significant damage to homes and powerlines in the Bass Lake area, blocking roads and creating a prolonged power outage.

Human History

Native People
Bass Lake was home to the Mono Native Americans who were the area's only human inhabitants until the time of the California Gold Rush. Many Mono were forcibly removed from Crane Valley in May 1851 during the Mariposa War that served to open the Southern Sierra Nevada to white settlers under the Act for the Government and Protection of Indians. Mono continued to live traditionally in the surrounding area until the creation of the Sierra National Forest in 1897 when permits became a requirement for the use of federal lands. Only citizens could get permits, and the rights of citizenship were not granted to Native Americans until the Indian Citizenship Act of 1924.

Development

Lumber Industry
In 1854, Charles P. Converse and Bill Chitiser built the first lumber mill at the base of Willow Creek falls. Their operation began the clearing of the Crane Valley basin, opening it up to ranching and farming, and ultimately, Bass Lake reservoir.

The logging industry boomed with the arrival of steam power. By the 1920s, the town of Wishon on the western shore of Bass Lake was the switching place for the Sugar Pine Lumber Company, the last logging company to be built in the Southern Sierra. Railroad tracks connected Bass Lake with the logging headquarters of Central Camp, which was serviced by the largest saddle-tank locomotive ever built to haul log cars up the twelve-mile, 4.5 percent grade. The railroad was never profitable, and in its final two years, operated as a heritage railway, running tourist excursions from Pinedale before shutting down in 1931.

Hydroelectricity
The lake was formed with the construction of Crane Valley reservoir by the San Joaquin Electric Company in 1901 to generate hydroelectric power for the residents of the San Joaquin Valley.

The dam has been enlarged several times. First in 1905, then in 1910 to a height of 145 feet. In 2012, an extensive seismic retrofit project was completed that buttressed the structure with 300,000 cubic yards of rock and raised the crest of the dam another 8 feet.

The lake fills to capacity during years of normal precipitation and seasonal snowpack with water released gradually over the summer and fall months to satisfy demand for irrigation and hydroelectric power. By December, the lake levels can be drawn down to 35% of total capacity, or 36 feet below crest elevation, in anticipation of seasonal weather and runoff. Bass Lake is not a multi-year water storage reservoir.

In November 2020, PG&E announced plans to sell the Crane Valley Hydroelectric Project, which includes the Bass Lake reservoir and surrounding PG&E owned property.

Recreational Use 

Much of the area surrounding Bass Lake is devoted to the tourism industry and is home to several small resorts and two summer camps.  The lake water typically reaches  during the summer months. Fishing, swimming, water skiing, and personal watercrafting are popular. Bass Lake is also a popular staging location for high Sierra excursions or day trips to nearby Yosemite National Park.

Hells Angels 
In 1963, Bass Lake became a yearly destination for the Hells Angels Motorcycle Club (HAMC), attracting hundreds of bikers from across the state. A first-hand report of the 1965 Bass Lake Run was reported by Hunter S. Thompson in his first book, Hell's Angels: The Strange and Terrible Saga of the Outlaw Motorcycle Gangs.

Most locals viewed the run as an annual menace that brought crime and frightened tourists away. Each year roadblocks, curfews, and campground restrictions were enforced by law enforcement from throughout Madera County and its surrounding areas in an effort to block, or at least control, the Hells Angels activity.

The run peaked in the 1970s before slowly fading away altogether by the late 1980s.

See also
 List of lakes in California

References

External links 
 Bass Lake weather and lake conditions
 
 Oakhurst Area Chamber of Commerce
 http://www.basslakechamber.com/history.html

Reservoirs in Madera County, California
Lakes of the Sierra Nevada (United States)
Sierra National Forest
Hells Angels
Reservoirs in California
Reservoirs in Northern California